María Fernanda Blázquez Gil (born July 21, 1973), known artistically  as Fey, is a Latin Grammy Award-nominated Mexican singer, songwriter, designer, dancer, record producer, and director. She has released seven studio albums and done one international tour and a short tour to promote her third studio album. She rose to fame with her self-titled debut album, Fey, released in 1995, which was followed by Tierna La Noche, and El Color De Los Sueños. All three studio albums were produced by José Ramón Florez. Tierna La Noche reached #10 on the Billboard Top Latin Albums chart.

Career

1990s

Fey released her first album, titled Fey, in 1995, through Sony Music (Mexico). Within a couple of months of the album's release, Fey had scored several hits in her native Mexico, and had reached #1 with "Media naranja", "Gatos en el balcon", "Me enamoro de ti" and "La noche se mueve". Fey toured Mexico, including consecutive concerts in the Teatro Metropolitan, and all of Latin America, and reached Gold status sales by the end of the year. In 1996 Fey released Tierna la Noche. "Azucar Amargo", the CD's first single, stayed in the Billboard chart for more than 30 weeks. Her tour, Tierna la noche, was also successful. Overall the tour consisted of more than 40 presentations in Mexico, the U.S. and Latin America, as well as some presentations in Europe. At the 9th Lo Nuestro Awards, Fey received a nomination for Pop New Artist. She is a vegetarian.

In 1998, and after more than 8 months of absence, Fey released her third album El color de los sueños, which itself was different from the preceding two in that the album was a mix of different rhythms and styles. "Ni tu ni nadie", the album's first single, instantly reached number one in the Latin charts; "Diselo con flores", "Canela" and "Cielo Liquido" soon followed. Although the record did very well in sales, it did not compare to the over-the-top success of Tierna la noche. In the overall period of the three first albums, Fey's amazing popularity and promotion caused all but 4 of the singles released to hit #1 in Mexico, with the most important being "Azucar Amargo", "Media Naranja", "Ni tu Ni Nadie", "Muevelo" and "Te Pertenezco", all of them spending more than a month in the top position in Mexico. After almost a year of promotion, Fey announced, at a 1999 charity concert, that: "everything has a cycle, and this is the end of mine".

Vertigo (fourth studio album)
Vertigo was released as a double edition with both an English and Spanish album. The English album contains three songs not included on the Spanish version. After two singles ("The Other Side" and "Dressing to Kill"), Fey left Sony and then retired for two years.

La Fuerza del Destino (fifth studio album)
In 2005, Fey, now a married woman, relaunched her career with La Fuerza del Destino, a tribute to the Spanish group Mecano. This album was successful; it contained three top-ten singles: "La Fuerza Del Destino", "Barco A Venus" and "Me Cuesta Tanto Olvidarte". A radio-only single, "Un Año Más", was released for the holiday season in Mexico.

Fey toured in support of this album at the Viña del Mar festival 2005, the Selena Vive! festival, and many local clubs across the United States and Latin America. The record excelled sales-wise, and it gave Fey her very first Latin Grammy nomination for "Best Pop Female Vocal Album". She also received 4 nominations for Premios Orgullosamente Latino 2005 & 2006-Ritmoson Latino and a Premio Oye nomination. She was recognized by the Gay & Lesbian Alliance Against Defamation (GLAAD) in Miami in 2006 for supporting gay human rights.

Faltan Lunas (sixth studio album)
After the success of her fifth album, Fey released a sixth one, Faltan Lunas and was produced by Carlos Jean. It was slated for an August 1, 2006, release, but was released on July 21, Fey's birthday. It features a pop/dance sound along with acoustic elements. The first single released was "Y Aquí Estoy". It was announced by Fey herself that the second single would be "Me Has Vuelto Loca", but it was changed to "Como Un Ángel". The album was only released in a few Latin American countries, and sold around 10,000 copies worldwide, making it her lowest selling album ever. "Como Un Ángel" was released in January 2007, but it failed to make an impact on the charts.

Dulce Tentación & Sweet Temptation (seventh studio album)
Dulce Tentación was released April 28, 2009, and the English version called "Sweet Temptation" was set to be released over the next months. The album was produced by Sam 'FISH' Fisher, who also co-wrote more than half of the songs on the record and will be distributed internationally by Universal Music. One track, "Cicatrices" ["Monsters"] was available for download Fey's official site  at the end of 2008. More than 170,000 downloads were registered while the track was available.

The first official single was "Lentamente" (Let Me Show You), a song that put Fey back in the top of the charts in México. The album was an unexpected success, winning a gold status for over 50.000 copies sold in less than one month in México. The second single Provócame (Games That you Play) was released in July 2009, however, a conflict between Fey and her new record label Mi Rey Music over promotion differences and the concept of the new video led Fey to part ways with the record label. Fey decided to create her own record label by buying the rights to her music and to Elephant Music from Mi Rey Music.

Late August 2009 Fey announced on her website that she was now in complete control of Elephant Music and continued to promote "Provócame", however, she suspended promotion of the single due to laryngitis. The video debuted on September 21, 2009; she also announced that she was to go on tour at the National Auditorium and record a live DVD. Fey toured clubs in the United States and Mexico.

The last single from the album was "Adicto A Mi Cuerpo". Initial plans for a music video were scrapped due to Fey deciding to move on and record a new album, making the single a radio-only release. However, it did chart on several online radio stations. "Sweet Temptation" was shelved as Fey decided to record a new album.

Family, return to Sony Music, Primera Fila (2012 - 2014)
During April 2010, it was announced via a press conference that Fey was in the studio recording her eighth studio album, with a lead single tentatively called "Te Amo A Mi Manera" previewed at the conference. The project went to hiatus because of her marriage to Alonso Orozco in September 2010. Fey gave birth to her first child, Isabella, in January, 2011.

On March 8, 2012, it was confirmed via Sony Music Mexico that Fey would be returning to the record company, after almost ten years since the release of Vértigo, and three years after the release of Dulce Tentación/Sweet Temptation, her last studio album. She had announced that her eighth album would be a Primera Fila, an album composed entirely of live renditions of her past hits and a few new songs. It was recorded in June, and it was released in October 2012. The first single, "Frío", was released on July, 21st during Fey's 39th birthday celebration. The album was certified gold just three weeks after its release, marking it a success in Fey's career. She began her "Todo Lo Que Soy" (All That I Am) tour in February 2013 in Mexico's National Auditorium, where she had set a record years before for most sold-out performances by a female artist, to positive reviews. In March 2013, Premios Oye announced Fey as the official image and spokesperson for that year's ceremony, where she also performed. On August 15, 2013, Fey performed "Azucar Amargo" at Premios Texas where she also won the "Best Pop/Rock Artist" award. In January 2014, Fey announced her divorce from Orozco.

Fey confirmed in April 2014 that she will be a judge for the 2014 season of the dance competition show, "Bailando Por Un Sueño" (Dancing for a Dream). On December 11, 2014, Fey announced the release date of her Todo Lo Que Soy live CD & DVD package to be released on December 17 physically and December 24 digitally of the same year.

'90s Pop, Desnuda, and Eternas Tours (2016 - onwards)
In February 2016, Fey officially released the single "No Me Acostumbro" alongside Cuban singer/actor Lenny de la Rosa, whom she had met as a judge on "Bailando Por Un Sueño" when he was a contestant. In the spring of 2016, Fey began promoting an upcoming tour called "Fey: 9.0 American Tour" which had a preview date in June 2016 in Mexico City's National Auditorium, home to Fey's own attendance record for a female recording artist. In September 2016, Fey released the digital single entitled "Amo", which was accompanied by a Fifty Shades of Grey inspired video.

In 2017, Fey joined the line-up of the '90s Pop Tour, joining artists Aleks Syntek, OV7, Erik Rubin, Beto Cuevas, JNS, and others.  The tour had many dates during the spring and summer of 2017 across Mexico and the US. After this tour, Fey announced plans to start her own tour in wanting to record a live CD & DVD.

In 2018, Fey released two new singles, "Comiendote Tu Besos," and "No Te Necesito" along with the announcement of a new tour called "Desnuda Tour" (Nude Tour), an entirely different show from what the 9.0 American Tour was set to be.  The tour began in October 2018 in Mexico with rave reviews its opening night as she performed songs from each of her previous albums.

On September 25, 2020, to celebrate the 25th anniversary of her career, Fey launched the English-language electronic single, "The Perfect Song" featuring Paul Oakenfold. In November 2020, Fey launched the recorded version of her "Desnuda Tour" via Cinepolis during a stream to raise funds for World Vision, a charity she is the ambassador for.

In February 2023, Fey announced that her and Alejandra Guzman will embark in a joint show called the "Eternas Tour" (Eternals Tour).  The show is currently undergoing some logistic delays, but is still slated to start the summer of 2023 and run through 2024.

Discography

Studio albums
 1995: Fey
 1996: Tierna La Noche
 1998: El Color de los Sueños
 2002: Vértigo
 2004: La Fuerza Del Destino
 2006: Faltan Lunas
 2009: Dulce Tentación/Sweet Temptation
 2012: Fey: Primera Fila
 2014: Todo Lo Que Soy-En Vivo

References

External links
 Official website
 

Mexican dance musicians
Mexican women pop singers
Mexican singer-songwriters
1973 births
Living people
Latin pop singers
Synth-pop singers
Mexican people of Argentine descent
Singers from Mexico City
EMI Latin artists
Age controversies
20th-century Mexican women singers
21st-century Mexican women singers
Women in Latin music